Jennifer Guthrie (born November 5, 1969) is an American actress. She is best known for her role as Annie Sloan on TV's Parker Lewis Can't Lose.

Early life
Guthrie was born in Willimantic, Connecticut. She attended Fox Lane High School in Bedford, New York.

Filmography

External links
 

1969 births
Living people
Actresses from New York (state)
American television actresses
21st-century American women